Deathtopia (stylized as DEATHTOPIA)  is a Japanese manga series written and illustrated by Yoshinobu Yamada. It was serialized in Kodansha's Evening from April 2014 to December 2016, with its chapters collected in eight tankōbon volumes.

Publication
Deathtopia is written and illustrated by Yoshinobu Yamada. It was serialized in Kodansha's Evening from April 22, 2014 to December 13, 2016. Kodansha collected its chapters in eight tankōbon volumes, released from July 23, 2014 to December 22, 2016.

In North America, Kodansha USA announced the English digital release of the manga in January 2017.

Volume list

See also
Cage of Eden, another manga series by the same author
Satanophany, another manga series by the same author

References

External links
 

Kodansha manga
Seinen manga
Supernatural thriller anime and manga